The Bundesvision Song Contest 2005 was the first edition of the annual Bundesvision Song Contest musical event. The contest was held on 12 February 2005 at the König Pilsener Arena in Oberhausen, North Rhine-Westphalia. The contest was hosted by Stefan Raab, Annette Frier, and Oliver Pocher in the green room. It was the first Germany-wide music competition in this format.

The winner of the Bundesvision Song Contest 2005 was alternative pop band Juli with the song "Geile Zeit", representing Hessen. In second place were Fettes Brot representing Schleswig-Holstein, and third place to Sido with  representing Berlin.

14 of the 16 states awarded themselves the maximum of 12 points, with North Rhine-Westphalia, and Rhineland-Palatinate, awarding themselves 10 points each.

The contest was broadcast by ProSieben and watched by 3.23 million people (11% market share). In the 14-49 age range 2.55 million people watched the contest (21.2% market share).

Origins 
The concept of the Bundesvision Song Contest was first introduced during episode 657 of the late-night television comedy talk show TV total by presenter Stefan Raab on 20 December 2004. The structure of the Bundesvision Song Contest is very similar to that of the Eurovision Song Contest, held among European countries; the Bundesvision Song Contest uses the sixteen states of Germany, only songs with (at least partially) German-speaking text were allowed, Stefan Raab also announced that the winning state would host the Bundesvision Song Contest 2006.

From 17 January 2005, the participants and their states were presented on TV total, for four weeks a themed evening was organised for each artist, in addition to a discussion with Raab about the chosen song.

Because suitable representatives were not found for all states, some artists represented states, to which they had no or only a very indirect tie, earning some criticism of the contest, for example, Cologne based band Klee representing Saarland, and not North Rhine-Westphalia.

Results

Scoreboard

Spokespersons 

North Rhine-Westphalia - Tobias Häusler
Hamburg - Matthias Lorenz-Meyer & Beata Arnold
Rhineland-Palatinate - Carmen Christin Burger
Bremen - Bella Lesnik
Bavaria - Holger Barnsteiner
Brandenburg - Marcus Kaiser
Schleswig-Holstein - Kaya Laß
Saarland - Martina Straten
Saxony - Peter Imhof
Baden-Württemberg - Hans Blomberg
Sachsen-Anhalt - Thomas Schminke
Hesse - Johannes Scherer
Thuringia - Anne Voigt
Berlin - Boussa Thiam
Mecklenburg-Vorpommern - Jens Herrmann
Lower Saxony - Frank Schambor

References

External links
 Official BSC website at tvtotal.de

2005
Bundesvision Song Contest
2005 song contests